Julieta Brodsky Hernández (born 10 October 1983) is a Chilean politician and anthropologist who has served as the Minister of Cultures, Arts and Heritage since 2022.

References

External links
 

1983 births
Living people
University of Granada alumni
Academy of Christian Humanism University alumni
21st-century Chilean politicians
Social Convergence politicians
Culture ministers of Chile
Women government ministers of Chile